The Koriukivka massacre was a mass murder of 6,700 residents of Koriukivka (then a village) in Ukraine on 1–2 March 1943 by the SS forces of Nazi Germany. 1,290 houses in Koriukivka were burned down and only ten brick buildings and a church survived. The residents of neighboring localities were intimidated and refused to help the Koriukivka residents. On 9 March, the Germans returned to Koriukivka and burned alive some elderly people who had returned to the village after escaping thinking it was safe.

According to forensic evidence, the deaths were brought on particularly by shootings from automatic weapons such as submachine guns and light machine guns also blows with blunt objects and burning. Some people were burned alive. The mass murder was committed as a retribution for Soviet partisan activities headed by Oleksiy Fedorov. Koriukivka was liberated by Soviet troops on 19 March 1943. A report on the number of victims and inflicted damage was compiled in the same year. The Koriukivka massacre became the largest German punitive operation against civilians in World War II.

Background
During the German occupation, the village of Koriukivka was a center of Soviet partisan warfare in Chernihiv Oblast. On the night of 27 February 1943, the partisans of Oleksiy Fedorov, having learned that the children of the commanders of a Soviet partisan unit were jailed in the Koriukivka prison, attacked the local Axis garrison, which consisted mostly of Hungarians. During that raid, 78 Axis soldiers were killed and eight captured. Several persons were released from the prison and some buildings were blown up. The partisans had warned the residents of Koriukivka about possible German retribution, but the next day after the partisan raid the way out was blocked. Nonetheless, at least one woman with three children managed to escape from Koriukivka on that day.

The massacre
On the morning of 1 March 1943 an SS unit came to Koriukivka from Shchors. Koriukivka was sealed off. Initially, the Germans tried to huddle all residents in the village's center. When some residents, anticipating the forthcoming killings, had tried to escape, the Germans started to enter all houses, shooting down every occupant. Those who were huddled in the village's centre were shot down in the village's largest buildings, the restaurant and the theater. In the restaurant, about 500 people were killed. Five of them managed to survive. An order to shoot down all Koriukivka residents who had escaped to neighboring settlements was issued.

According to historian Dmytro Vedeneyev, the massacre was committed by SS and collaborationist auxiliary police. The number of perpetrators of the massacre is estimated at 300–500. 5,612 victims of the massacre remain unidentified.

References

1943 in Ukraine
Massacres in 1943
Massacres in Ukraine
Nazi war crimes in Ukraine
Punitive expeditions
March 1943 events
Razed cities
Massacres committed by Nazi Germany
History of Chernihiv Oblast
Hungarian war crimes